Brookland may refer to:

England
Brookland, Kent, England

United States
(by state)
Brookland, Arkansas
Brookland (Washington, D.C.), a neighborhood of Washington, D.C.
Brooklyn, New York, sometimes known as "Brookland" before the current spelling was settled upon
Brookland (Flat Rock, North Carolina), listed on the NRHP
Brookland (Grassy Creek, North Carolina), listed on the NRHP
New Brookland Historic District, West Columbia, SC, listed on the NRHP
Brookland Park Historic District, Richmond, VA, listed on the NRHP